Vieil may refer to:

Ainay-le-Vieil, commune in the Cher department in central France
Chauvirey-le-Vieil, village and commune in the Haute-Saône département, in the French region of Franche-Comté
Gissey-le-Vieil, commune in the Côte-d'Or department in eastern France
Le Vieil-Évreux, commune in the Eure department and Haute-Normandie region of France
Le Vieil-Baugé, commune in the Maine-et-Loire department in western France
Le Vieil-Dampierre, commune in the Marne department in northeastern France
Pithiviers-le-Vieil, commune in the Loiret department in north-central France
Rosoy-le-Vieil, commune in the Loiret department in north-central France
Saint-Florent-le-Vieil, commune in the Maine-et-Loire department in western France
Saint-Martin-le-Vieil, commune in the Aude department in southern France
Saint-Maurice-le-Vieil, commune in the Yonne département, in the French region of Bourgogne
Vendin-le-Vieil, commune in the Pas-de-Calais department in the Nord-Pas-de-Calais region of France
Vieil-Hesdin, commune in the Pas-de-Calais department in the Nord-Pas-de-Calais region of France
Vieil-Moutier, commune in the Pas-de-Calais department in the Nord-Pas-de-Calais region of France